Karašica or Baranjska Karašica or Karassó is a river in southern Hungary and eastern Croatia.

Karašica rises in the southern slopes of the Mecsek mountain in southern Hungary, near the village of Erdősmecske. It flows towards the south into a plain, through Szederkény, and its flow is regulated by man. It continues on through Villány, turns southeast and enters Croatia near the village of Luč and meanders in Baranja in an eastward direction. It passes near Popovac and Draž and flows into the Danube north of Batina.

References

External links
 

Rivers of Croatia
Rivers of Hungary
International rivers of Europe